Arnica chamissonis, the Chamisso arnica, is a North American species of plants in the family Asteraceae. It is very similar to Arnica montana. Arnica chamissonis is native to North America and naturalized in parts of Europe while A. montana is indigenous to Europe.

Distribution and habitat
Arnica chamissonis is native to western North America, including Alaska, and most of Canada including Yukon and Northwest Territories. Arnica chamissonis is perennial. They are adapted to both coarse and medium textured soils with a pH between 6.0–7.2. It generally prefers moist meadows and conifer forests and often grows in montane to subalpine zones, . Seeds are easily available and the plant can be grown in a home garden.

Morphology

Arnica chamissonis has yellow flowers with green medium textured foliage. The leaves of the Arnica chamissonis are grouped in 4–10 pairs. It produces brown seeds and has an active growth period of the spring and summer. It has rhizomatous growth and grows at a moderate rate. Rhizomatous plants have an underground stem with small fiber-like adventitious roots.

Reproduction and growth
Arnica chamissonis has an active bloom period throughout the summer. There are approximately 400,000 seeds per pound. These individuals have a medium seedling vigor and a moderate vegetative spread rate. Seedling vigor refers to "the expected seedling survival percentage of the plant compared to other species with the same growth habit." A vegetative spread rate refers to how quickly a plant can spread through a given area. In general, A. chamissonis can be grown in a container, by using seeds or sprigs.

Both A. montana and A. chamissonis contain the toxin helenalin.

The species is named for German poet and botanist Adelbert von Chamisso, 1781–1838.

References

External links
 

chamissonis
Flora of Canada
Flora of the Western United States
Flora of California
Flora of the Rocky Mountains
Flora of the Sierra Nevada (United States)
Plants described in 1831
Adelbert von Chamisso
Flora without expected TNC conservation status